Yujiulü is a given surname, generally used by the Yujiulü clan, the ruling family of the Rouran Khaganate. Notable people with the name include:

Consort Yujiulü (died 452), formally Empress Gong, a consort of Tuoba Huang, a crown prince of the Xianbei-led Northern Wei dynasty of China
Empress Yujiulü (525-540), formally Empress Dao, an empress of the Xianbei-led Western Wei dynasty of China
Yujiulü Anagui (died 552), khan of the Rouran (520-552) with the title of Chiliantoubingdoufa Khan
Yujiulü Anluochen (died 554), khan of the Rouran (553-554)
Yujiulü Chounu (died 520), khan of the Rouran (508-520) with the title of Douluofubadoufa Khan
Yujiulü Datan (died 429 AD), khan of the Rouran (414-429) with the title of Mouhanheshenggai Khan
Yujiulü Dengshuzi (died 555), the last khan of the Rouran
Yujiulü Doulun (died 492), khan of the Rouran (485-492) with the title of Fumingdun Khan
Yujiulü Futu (died 508), khan of the Rouran (506-508) with the title of Tuohan Khan
Yujiulü Hulü (died 414), an early 5th century Aikugai Khan (ruler) of the Rouran
Yujiulü Kangti (died 553) khan of the Rouran (553)
Yujiulü Mugulü (born before 277), ancestor of the Rouran tribe and the Yujiulü clan
Yujiulü Nagais (died 506) khan of the Rouran (492-506) with the title of Houqifudaikezhe Khan
Yujiulü Shelun (391–410), Khagan of the Rouran (402-410)
Yujiulü Tiefa (died 553), khan of the Rouran (552-553)
Yujiulü Tuhezhen, khan of the Rouran (444-464) with the title of Chu Khan
Yujiulü Wuti, khan of the Rouran (429–444) with the title of Chilian Khan
Yujiulü Yucheng (died 485) khan of the Rouran (464-485) with the title of Shouluobuzhen Khan

Rouran
Yujiulü clan